Ross River may refer to:

Watercourses

Australia
 Ross River (Queensland), the main river that flows through Townsville, Queensland, Australia
 Ross River Dam, located at the end of Riverway Drive in the City of Townsville
 Ross Creek (North Queensland), a tributary of the Ross River, near Townsville

Canada
 Jos-Ross River, a river of Quebec, tributary of the Portneuf River
 Ross River (Eastmain River), tributary of Eastmain River, in Nord-du-Québec, Québec
 Ross River (Yukon), one of the main tributaries of the Pelly River
 Ross River, Yukon, an unincorporated community found where the Ross River meets the Pelly
 Ross River Dena Council, a First Nations group in Ross River
 Ross River Airport, the airport that serves the community

Medicine and diseases
 Ross River virus, an arbovirus of the genus Alphavirus
 Ross River Fever, a mosquito-transmitted Alphavirus